Jaden Shiloh Eikermann Gregorchuk (born 14 February 2005) is a German diver.

He represented his country at the 2021 Summer Olympic Games in Tokyo finishing 21st in the qualification.

References 

2005 births
Living people
People from Mettmann (district)
Sportspeople from Düsseldorf (region)
German male divers
Olympic divers of Germany
Divers at the 2020 Summer Olympics
21st-century German people